The Railroad Museum of Long Island   is a railway museum based on the North Fork, of Long Island, New York, in the United States. It has two locations, the main location in Riverhead, and a satellite location in Greenport, west of the North Ferry to Shelter Island. Both facilities contain active model railroad displays and gift shops.

Riverhead
The Riverhead location of the museum is located in a former Nassau-Suffolk Lumber Company warehouse and showroom at 416 Griffing Avenue, east of the Riverhead LIRR station. It was used as a lumber yard as far back as 1885, (The Corwin & Vail Lumber Company), and from 1891 to 1969 contained a turntable, water tower, and pump house, (the Long Island Railroad - Riverhead Yard).

The location contains numerous rare passenger and freight cars as well as locomotives in various stages of restoration, some of which are the last of their kind. It also has a 16" gauge Allan Herschell Park Train riding train from the LIRR Pavilion of the 1964 - 1965 World's Fair.

Located in the Freeman North Exhibit Hall, a renovated warehouse on the property, is the Historic Lionel Layout, an "O" Gauge model train layout donated to the Museum by Lionel L.L.C. in 2009.  The 14' by 40' trainset is based on the 1940s Lionel Showroom Layout from New York City.  It was constructed by Lionel employees in 1992 and operated at Lionel's facilities in Chesterfield, Michigan through 2008.

Greenport
The Greenport RMLI site is located in the former 1892 LIRR freight house of the historic Greenport Railroad Station. Throughout its history, the freight house served as a branch of the United States Post Office, Railway Express Agency, and a storage facility for LIRR Road 'n' Rail buses. Today the station contains a restored 1927 LIRR wooden caboose, a 40' Pacific Car & Foundry boxcar, and a snowplow,"W-83 JAWS," built by the LIRR shop forces as well as artifacts and photographs and other items of LIRR history.

Gallery

References

External links

RMLI Official Website
RMLI Property at Riverhead (TrainsAreFun.com)
LIRR and RMLI stations at Riverhead and Greenport (Unofficial LIRR Photography Site)
"Railroad Museums Bring Life Back to Railway History of Long Island," by Maggie Cai; PRNDL LI; Long Island Transportation News (December 5, 2016)

Railroad museums in New York (state)
Museums in Suffolk County, New York
Riverhead (town), New York
Southold, New York
Model railway shows and exhibitions